Marty Riessen and Margaret Court were the defending champions, but Court did not compete. Riessen partnered with Martina Navrátilová but lost in the second round to Tony Roche and Françoise Dürr.

Roche and Dürr defeated Dick Stockton and Rosie Casals in the final, 6–3, 2–6, 7–5 to win the mixed doubles tennis title at the 1976 Wimbledon Championships.

Seeds

  Sandy Mayer /  Billie Jean King (second round)
  Frew McMillan /  Betty Stöve (semifinals)
  Marty Riessen /  Martina Navrátilová (second round)
  Alex Metreveli /  Olga Morozova (first round)

Draw

Finals

Top half

Section 1

Section 2

Bottom half

Section 3

Section 4

References

External links

1976 Wimbledon Championships – Doubles draws and results at the International Tennis Federation

X=Mixed Doubles
Wimbledon Championship by year – Mixed doubles